3 Idiots (stylized as "3 idiots") is a 2009 Indian Hindi-language coming-of-age comedy-drama film written, edited and directed by Rajkumar Hirani, co-written by Abhijat Joshi and produced by Vidhu Vinod Chopra. Adapted loosely from Chetan Bhagat's novel Five Point Someone, the film stars Aamir Khan, R. Madhavan and Sharman Joshi in the titular roles, marking their reunion three years after Rang De Basanti (2006), while Kareena Kapoor, Boman Irani and Omi Vaidya star in pivotal roles. Narrated through two parallel dramas, one in the present and the other set ten years in the past, the story follows the friendship of three students at an Indian engineering college and is a satire about the social pressures under the Indian education system.

Produced by Chopra under the banner Vinod Chopra Films, 3 Idiots incorporated real Indian inventions created by Remya Jose, Mohammad Idris, Jahangir Painter and Sonam Wangchuk, the latter of whom also inspired Khan's character.

Upon its release on December 25, 2009, 3 Idiots received widespread critical acclaim and commercial success and is considered to be among the greatest Bollywood films ever made; it was also the highest-grossing film in its opening weekend in India, had the highest opening day collections for an Indian film up until that point, and also held the record for the highest net collections in the first week for a Hindi film. Eventually, it became one of the few Indian films at the time to become successful in East Asian markets such as China and Japan, eventually bringing its worldwide gross to 392 crore ($90million) — it was the highest-grossing Indian film ever at the time and the highest grossing Indian film of the 2000s. It is also the 17th highest grossing Indian film of all time. The film also had a social impact on attitudes toward education in India, as well as in other Asian countries such as China.

At the 57th National Film Awards, 3 Idiots won 3 National Film Awards, including Best Popular Film Providing Wholesome Entertainment. Additionally, the film received 11 nominations at the 55th Filmfare Awards, including Best Actor (Khan), Best Actress (Kapoor) and Best Supporting Actor (Madhavan and Joshi), and won a leading 6 awards (tying with Dev.D), including Best Film, Best Director (Hirani) and Best Supporting Actor (Irani). Overseas, it won the Grand Prize at Japan's Videoyasan Awards, while it was nominated for Best Outstanding Foreign Language Film at the Japan Academy Awards and Best Foreign Film at China's Beijing International Film Festival. 

The film was remade in Tamil as Nanban (2012), which also received critical praise and commercial success. A Mexican remake, 3 Idiotas, was also released in 2017.

Plot 
In their first year of college, students Farhan Qureshi and Raju Rastogi join the prestigious Imperial College of Engineering (ICE) in Delhi and meet Ranchhoddas Shamaldas Chanchad (aka Rancho), their roommate. Rancho is passionate about experimenting and consequently tops the class. Rancho's carefree approach to education results in him being at odds with the college's director, Dr. Viru Sahastrabuddhe (nicknamed "Virus" by the students), who believes in a strict and competitive education system.

When a student named Joy Lobo commits suicide after failing to meet a project deadline, Rancho confronts Virus about the extreme pressure placed on ICE students, but is rudely rebuffed. One night, the trio gatecrashes a wedding and meet Virus' youngest daughter, Pia, only later realizing that the wedding is for Pia's older sister, Mona. Although initially upset by Rancho’s behavior, Pia develops a crush on Rancho’s after he pranks her boyfriend Suhas, showing his materialistic side. Fed up with Suhas' materialistic attitude, Pia angrily breaks up with him. An infuriated Virus warns Farhan and Raju about the effects of them being friends with Rancho by pointing out the modest financial situations of their families, scaring Raju into bunking with Chatur "Silencer" Ramalingam, a competitive, arrogant student who believes in learning by rote memorization. To teach Chatur a lesson about memorization, Rancho and Farhan secretly make obscene modifications to the script of Chatur's teacher's day speech. After a disastrous speech before the teachers, Virus, and the Minister of Education, the embarrassed and furious Chatur makes a bet with Rancho to see who will be more successful after ten years.

The night before their final exams, Raju's paralyzed father experiences a heart attack. With Pia's help, Rancho rushes Raju's father to the hospital on Pia's scooter. After realizing that Rancho saved his father's life, Raju reconciles with him. At the end of the year, Rancho comes first in the class, while Farhan and Raju are last and second to last, respectively. During the yearly class photo, Rancho makes a bet with Virus that if either Raju or Farhan gets a job from on-campus interviews, Virus will shave his mustache.

One night in their fourth year of college, Rancho tells his friends why they consistently place last: Farhan's passion is photography, not engineering, and Raju lacks self-confidence. After Farhan and Raju promise to confront their problems if Rancho confesses his feelings for Pia, the three of them drunkenly break into Virus' house. Virus spots them during their escape, recognizing Raju, and the next day gives Raju an ultimatum: to incriminate his friends or be expelled himself. Distraught, Raju attempts suicide but survives, leading to Virus revoking the expulsion. Raju recovers, thanks to the support and care of his friends and family. Raju is successful in a job interview, while Farhan convinces his father to let him become a photographer.

Virus, in an attempt to protect his fragile ego, tries to sabotage Raju's chances of success by holding an unfairly difficult exam. With Pia's help, Rancho and Farhan break into Virus' office and steal the exam paper. Upon being given the paper, Raju refuses to cheat and throws it away, but the three of them are caught and expelled. Pia confronts her father over her brother's suicide, which was prompted by similar pressure placed on him by Virus. That night, during a heavy rainstorm, Mona, who is pregnant, goes into labor. Unable to drive to a hospital, Rancho modifies a vacuum cleaner into a ventouse and delivers the baby with the help of Pia, Farhan, and Raju. A grateful Virus acknowledges Rancho by giving him a valuable space pen, which he promised to give only to his most distinguished student, and revokes the trio's expulsions. On graduation day, Rancho suddenly disappears.

10 years later
Chatur, now the prosperous vice president of a reputable company in California, calls Farhan and Raju to remind them of the bet he made with Rancho about who would be more successful. The three of them set out to find Rancho. Upon reaching Shimla, where Chatur has located Rancho's house, they come across a different man named Ranchhoddas Shyamaldas Chanchad, whose face is pasted over Rancho's in their graduation portrait. The man is reluctant to reveal anything at first and threatens the trio at gunpoint, only relenting after Farhan and Raju threaten to flush his late father's ashes down a toilet. He explains that the "Rancho" at ICE was his family's gardener's son "Chhote", who was incredibly intelligent and gifted. Ranchhoddas' father paid for Chhote to attend ICE, on condition that he use his son's name and, after graduating, cut all contact with anyone at ICE. Chhote, who was more interested in learning than in getting a degree, agreed, but afterward warned that two idiots would come looking for him one day. Ranchoddas gives them Chhote/Rancho's address in Ladakh.

On the way there, Farhan and Raju gatecrash Pia's wedding to her materialistic boyfriend Suhas in Manali and convince her to come with them to find Rancho. At the address in Ladakh, the group is astonished to find a thriving school. They meet "Millimetre", formerly an errand boy at ICE, now Rancho's assistant, who tells them that Rancho has keenly followed their careers. They reunite with Rancho on a sandbar. Rancho admits he is still in love with Pia and the two share a kiss. Chatur assumes that Rancho is a mere schoolteacher and mocks him, but Rancho reveals himself to be Phunsukh Wangdu, a successful inventor with 400 patents, whom Chatur's company is courting. A flabbergasted Chatur accepts defeat as the others run away from him laughing.

Cast 
 Aamir Khan as Ranchhoddas "Rancho" Shyamaldas Chanchad / Phunsukh Wangdu
 R. Madhavan as Farhan Qureshi
 Sharman Joshi as Raju Rastogi
 Kareena Kapoor as Pia Sahastrabuddhe, a successful doctor and Rancho’s love interest 
 Boman Irani as Dr. Viru "Virus" Sahastrabuddhe
 Omi Vaidya as Chatur "Silencer" Ramalingam
 Rahul Kumar as Manmohan a.k.a. "Millimetre"
Dushyant Wagh as a grown-up Manmohan a.k.a. "Centimetre"
 Farida Dadi as Nuzzhat Qureshi
 Parikshit Sahni as Salim Qureshi
 Amardeep Jha as Suman Rastogi
 Mukund Bhatt as Rajendra Rastogi
 Mona Singh as Mona Sahastrabuddhe
 Sanjay Lafont as Suhaas Tandon, Pia’s ostentatious and materialistic boyfriend who only cares about money and expensive things
 Achyut Potdar as Machine Class Professor
 Chaitali Bose as Kamini "Kammo" Rastogi
 Jayant Kripalani as a company head who conducts Raju's job interview
 Akhil Mishra as Librarian Dubey
 Rajeev Ravindranathan as ragging senior student

Cameo appearances 
 Javed Jaffrey as the real Ranchhoddas Shyamaldas Chanchad
 Arun Bali as Shyamaldas Chanchad
 Ali Fazal as Joy Lobo, a guy committed suicide because of Viru Sahastrabuddhe
 Atul Tiwari as Education Minister R. D. Tripathi, who appears in the Speech scene
 Madhav Vaze as Michael Lobo
 Meghna Bhalla as Sumi, Raju's wife
 Harvinder Singh as Joginder Singh Dhillon
 Sanjay Sood as Peanut Vendor in Shimla
 Supriya Shukla as a doctor with Pia

Production

Development 

After the success of Lage Raho Munna Bhai (2006), the director Rajkumar Hirani and screenwriter Abhijat Joshi had plans for third instalment on the Munna Bhai franchise, titled Munnabhai Chale Amerika. But Hirani felt exhausted working on consecutive films on the same format, and decided to work on fresh script outside the franchise. While writing the first draft of the film, he thought of a new project rather than the new instalment from the film series, but he had concentrated more on the project and then worked on the former first. While thinking about how the project coming under fruition, he got the popular novel Five Point Someone by the author Chetan Bhagat. The latter gave this novel for Hirani to read, in order to have an idea about the script. Impressed by the novel, he decided to adapt the screenplay by making changes to the original novel and work on it as a feature film.

3 Idiots is considered to be the first of the two adaptations from the novel Five Point Someone — the second being Kai Po Che! (2013), which also drew inspiration from the novel The 3 Mistakes of My Life written by Bhagat. In the third collaboration with Hirani after the Munna Bhai film series: Munna Bhai M.B.B.S. (2003) and Lage Raho Munna Bhai (2006), Vidhu Vinod Chopra produced the project under the production company Vinod Chopra Films (which earlier named Vinod Chopra Productions). Besides producing, Chopra further associated with Hirani and Joshi, by co-writing the screenplay. In his biography Unscripted: Conversations on Life and Cinema, he discussed about the experiences as a co-writer being associated in the project.

An official announcement regarding the film was made during early-2008, after working in the script for more than one-and-a-half year. During the pre-production, Hirani went to multiple engineering colleges, including those under the Indian Institutes of Technology in Mumbai and Delhi, to authenticate the lives of engineering students. In this he met, many students and took pictures along with them. He needed the references for the clothes used, their looks and things they brought as many IIT-students were older than the fictional characters. The film also had shared many anecdotes from his college life, since Hirani had used to study in hostel during his young period. Hirani had carefully looked upon the notion in the lives of engineering students, as there are few things apart from drugs, sex and violence. However, Hirani had said that the film plays a satirical take on social pressures under an Indian education system. Apart from that, the film also addresses the issue of tussle between parents and children, but in a "sugar-coated manner". During the promotions of the film, Hirani stated that "the film is completely different of the Munna Bhai film series; in terms of the characters, story and the environment. However, both the films fall in the same genre, where all three films are heartwarming stories with lovable characters making it feel good. Both films have true emotions in the heart, happiness, sadness and also leave a strong message to the audience in the ending that make us satisfy".

Casting 

The casting of the lead actors was considered to be "complex", according to Hirani. He thought of many actors playing the lead roles, and also went on a six-month audition across the country. But, had thought of established actors playing the roles, since the film had two looks and the actors needed experience. He had plans for Shah Rukh Khan playing the lead character, Ranchoddas Chanchad. Hirani tried to rope Khan after the latter, exited from the director's debut venture Munna Bhai M.B.B.S. (2003), for the titular role Munna Bhai, which was later essayed by Sanjay Dutt. However, Khan refused being a part of the film due to his prior commitments. He approached Ranbir Kapoor, then, a relatively newcomer, to play the lead role, but he opposed his part in the film. However, he agreed to play Varun Sahastrabuddhe having a short cameo in the film.

Aamir Khan was later finalized to play the lead role. R. Madhavan and Sharman Joshi were also finalised for the other two leads  Farhan and Raju. Originally, the roles initially went to John Abraham and Saif Ali Khan, but the actors rejected the film due to date issues, and Arshad Warsi who also collaborated with Hirani in the two films, in Munnai Bhai film series, despite being auditioned, could not take up the role. Before R. Madhavan was cast, Bangalore-based Rajeev Ravindranathan shot for his character for two months before his scenes were removed in favor of casting a "known face". Ravindranathan later played a college senior. On being questioned about casting older actors, to play college students as the main lead, Hirani said in an interview to Rediff, stating that "the actors chosen have that quality which he wanted for the film apart from the body language, mannerisms and innocence portrayed on-screen".

The team approached Sanjay Dutt, whom Hirani worked in the Munna Bhai film series, to play the role of the main antagonist Dr. Viru Sahastrabuddhe, but due to various reasons, the role went to Boman Irani. The character name was considered to be unique due to the look, lisp and mannerisms portrayed, and also got the nickname "Virus", as students give names to their professors and principals in their school and college life. For the preparation of his role, Boman used to wear costumes made by cheap fabric, designed by an old tailor, who stitches clothes for Parsis in Dadar (North-Central Mumbai). He used to wear the shirt with velcro being attached, and a hook tie, with the same look, he attended the shoot to prepare for his role. Initially, Boman was hesitant to act in that film and had recommended his co-actor Irrfan Khan for Viru Sahastrabuddhe, but his refusal prompted Boman to take up the role. This was revealed by Boman after Khan's death in April 2020.

After talks with Kajol fell through, Kareena Kapoor played the role of Pia Sahastrabuddhe, Rancho's (Aamir) love interest and a medical student. While, Hirani refused about the original casting for her role in the film in his interview, it has been regarded that Anushka Sharma was originally considered for the role. In April 2021, an old video of Anushka's audition for the film went viral on the internet. Anushka, then a newcomer, shared monologues recited by Gracy Singh from Munna Bhai M.B.B.S. for the audition process, supposing to be her debut in films, but was ultimately rejected by the producers. She later made her debut in the Yash Raj Films' production Rab Ne Bana Di Jodi (2008), being cast opposite Shah Rukh Khan. Omi Vaidya, an American actor was cast for the role Chathur Ramalingam (Silencer)". Ali Fazal, then, a rookie actor, played a small role as Joy Lobo in the film. While speaking about his role, Fazal stated that "he went into depression as the character arc seemed to mirror a tragic real-life incident". Javed Jaffrey, played a cameo appearance as real Ranchoddas Chanchad.

Filming 
The rehearsals for the film began prior to the shoot, followed by script reading and look tests. After extensive pre-production works, principal photography for the film began on 28 July 2008, with scenes featuring the supporting cast being shot first. On 29 August 2008, shooting for the key schedule began with the principal cast members. The first scene was shot in an aircraft with Madhavan, which was the first shooting schedule for this film in Mumbai. The team left to Ladakh, for a 20-day schedule with the crew and cast comprising Khan and Kapoor. The climax was being shot at the Pangong Tso lake in Ladakh. The team took a break following Aamir Khan's activities in the promotions and post-production works of Ghajini (2008).

In December 2008, the entire cast and crew, including Khan, Madhavan, Joshi and Hirani, headed to Indian Institute of Management, Bangalore campus which served as Imperial College of Engineering. To prepare for the roles, the crew members stayed at the institution's dormitory blocks and at the college hostel. Though Khan saw the pictures of the location, he decided to see the location for real and wanted to stay at the hostel, in order to get through the role. Khan regularly met the students during the morning and evenings and shared the experiences of studies and way of life. Apart from that, the team eventually mingled with the students while Khan also involved in many indoor and outdoor games. While shooting for the film, the team made extra precautions with none of the shooting process might affect the routine class sessions. It was the first film to be shot at the Indian Institutes of Management Group, and the university granted an academic pay-off for itself. After shooting being completed the makers will film a documentary on the institution. Few parts in Bangalore were doubled as New Delhi for the film. The entire shooting process was completed within February 2009. The entire film was shot in reverse, with the present-day scenes being shot first and the college scenes were shot later.

C. K. Muraleedharan was the cinematographer for 3 Idiots, after collaborating with Hirani for Lage Raho Munna Bhai (2006). He used Arricam Lite (LT) camera for shooting the film, which consisted of Angenieux Optimo Anamorphic Lenses and Zeiss Master Prime Lenses, with the film had a distributed aspect ratio of 2.39:1. Rajkumar Hirani also undertook supervision of editing the film. For the scene where the leads get drunk and break in Virus' house, Aamir suggested that the actors might get drunk in reality so as to make it look convincing, but, however, the actors went on numerous retakes, which even led the stock of film roll being exhausted. The actors continued to do retakes, until the new rolls have been bought, so as to keep them busy. The pregnancy scene was initially supposed to be placed in Hirani's debut film Munna Bhai M.B.B.S. (2003), but as he felt that the placement was irrelevant in the film, the team decided against doing so, and then was used in this film. The hospital scenes were shot at Fortis Hospital (Noida).

The film uses real inventions, with brains behind these innovations include Remya Jose, a student from Kerala, who created the pedal operated washing-machine; Mohammad Idris, a barber from Hasanpur Kalan in Meerut district in Uttar Pradesh, who invented a bicycle-powered horse clipper; and Jahangir Painter, a painter from Maharashtra, who made the scooter-powered flour mill. The character Phunsuk Wangdu drew inspiration from Ladakhi inventor Sonam Wangchuk, a mechanical engineering graduate from the National Institute of Technology, Srinagar.

Music 

The film's soundtrack is composed by Shantanu Moitra with lyrics penned by Swanand Kirkire. It marked Moitra's second consecutive collaboration with Rajkumar Hirani after Lage Raho Munna Bhai (2006), whose music album was successful. Besides composing the songs, Moitra also composed the film score with Sanjay Wandrekar and Atul Raninga. The album was created with the inspiration of Moitra's college days, with the songs been written in consideration on the mindset of youngsters in India.

The album features five original compositions. Two tracks from the album were remixed, despite Moitra not liking the trend of remixing film songs. Sonu Nigam rendered five out of seven tracks from the album. Other singers performing vocals to the songs are Shaan, Shreya Ghoshal, Suraj Jagan, Jaive Samsun, the lyricist Kirkire and composer Moitra themselves, recording for the soundtrack. One of the tracks "Give Me Some Sunshine" was sung by one of the lead actors, Sharman Joshi, in his maiden attempt in playback singing. The music album was released online (instead of a launch event), by the film's official website on 27 November 2009, with a video chat featuring the cast and crew members.

The album received positive reviews from critics, with praise directed towards Moitra's composition and the quality of the album. In addition, the soundtrack became the highest-selling Bollywood soundtrack of 2009, according to the trade website Box Office India, despite the sales of conventional music CDs being declined. Due to the internet boom, it became the "most downloaded Bollywood music album of the year". "Aal Izz Well" was listed as one of the "Top 10 Bollywood Songs of 2009" and became a sensation amongst the youngsters. The soundtrack further fetched a number of accolades is considered as one of Moitra's best albums, along with Parineeta (2005) and Lage Raho Munna Bhai (2006).

Release

Statistics 
3 Idiots released on 25 December 2009 over 1550 prints and 1760 screens in India, which was considered to a "wide domestic release for a Bollywood film" at that time, according to trade analysts. Major multiplexes allotted more than 95% of screens for the film, prior to the release. It also had a wide-overseas release with about 344 prints in 415 screens. However, Bollywood Hungama and The Times of India reported that the film had got about 342–366 screens. The film's wide-release in about 32 countries, excluding India — United States, Canada, United Kingdom, United Arab Emirates, South Africa, East and West Africa, Fiji, Belgium, Netherlands, Mauritius, Malaysia, Singapore, Australia and New Zealand — was noted by trade analysts, that it may slow down the business of James Cameron-directorial Avatar (2009), released prior a week, had broken all box-office records. Producer Vinod Chopra stated that, a multiplex in Australia reduced shows for Avatar, in order to get huge number of shows for this film.

Following its success, the film was screened in the East Asian markets; the film was released in Taiwan on 17 December 2010, followed by Hong Kong on 1 September 2011. In China, it was released as San Ge Shagua ("Three Idiots"), on 15 December 2011. In South Korea, it was released on 29 December 2011. Along with the original Hindi version, a Mandarin Chinese dubbed version was also released, with the popular actress Tang Wei voicing Kapoor's role, and Huang Bo voicing Khan's role. In January 2013, the film was distributed by Apex Entertainment and CJ Entertainment to release the film in the Korean markets and was released on 25 January 2013. Following its success in other Asian markets, Japanese distributor Nikkatsu announced plans to release the film in Japan. It was released there in June 2013, under the Japanese title .

Screenings 
In November 2009, Aamir Khan invited hundreds of people to watch the first half of the film exclusively in a basis of Non-disclosure Agreement. 3 Idiots, thereby being the first film in Bollywood to use this clause, which was prevalent in Hollywood; the lead actor asked people to share the opinions about the film. The premiere show for the film was held in Mumbai on 23 December 2009. Along with the film's cast and crew, the event saw the presence of Anil Kapoor, Shah Rukh Khan, Salman Khan, Saif Ali Khan and other named celebrities, including Hirani's earlier collaborators such as Sanjay Dutt, Vidya Balan, Arshad Warsi and Dia Mirza. Amitabh Bachchan who had earlier confirmed his presence at the premiere ultimately did not turn up in the end. The special premiere in United States and Canada were held on 24 December, prior to the Indian release. On 30 January 2010, a special screening of the film was conducted to the veteran actor Dilip Kumar. He constantly followed the news of the film and wanted to watch it in a theatre, but due to his health condition, he could not get out of his home. Later, Chopra and Hirani expressed Dilip's wish and agreed to conduct a private screening for the actor. Chopra said that he "really moved after seeing the film and felt nostalgic". Later, he urged to discuss about the film and its making with Chopra and Hirani at the former's apartment in Bandra, with the discussion went on for two hours.

On 19 May 2010, the film was screened at the Headquarters of the United Nations in New York, with Rajkumar Hirani and the film's team attending the screening. The members of the United Nations, came in touch with the producer regarding the screening of the film, following its influence in youngsters about the Indian education system. More than 700 invitees, including non-Indians, turned up for the screening, despite the hall had capacity for about 600-650 people. A two-hour long post-screening session was conducted to the attendees to focus on "how the film has impacted mindsets". The film was screened at the Indian Film Festival of Melbourne in March 2010, to bridging the cultural gap between India and Australia, following the Violence against Indians in Australia during late-January 2010. It may also help Bollywood markets to screen their film in Australia. The film was screened at the Aruba International Film Festival held on 10 June 2010.

At the Indian Film Festival of London, held during 25–29 August 2010, the film was screened along with Chopra's other five films — An Encounter with Faces (1978); Parinda (1989); 1942: A Love Story (1993) and Eklavya: The Royal Guard (2007), while further honouring an award for Chopra. A charity screening of the film was also held with the proceedings being contributed to UNICEF. At the inauguration of Vidhu Vinod Chopra film festival, to honour the director-producer, 3 Idiots along with the director's other films, Eklavya: The Royal Guard, Mission Kashmir and the Munna Bhai film series, were screened at the festival on 30 March 2012. 3 Idiots became one of the few Indian films screened at the inaugural Indian Film Festival held in Ho Chi Minh City (Vietnam) in December 2015. The film was further screened at the inaugural Himalayan Film Festival held during 24–28 September 2021 in Ladakh.

Marketing 
Aamir Khan used innovative marketing strategies for the promotions of the films, in order to gain wide exposure among audience. Anil Arjun, the CEO of Reliance MediaWorks which produced and distributed the film had stated that, a 40-member team was put in place to market the film four months prior to the release. He said that "the campaign was made such a way that it appeals to all category of viewers — people who are going to multiplexes in metros and single screens in small towns". The film was shown to all stakeholders and the company employees prior to the release, and a 360-degree marketing campaign was made after the release, which covered digital, outdoor, brand partnerships, public relations and merchandise.

The "butt chairs" used by the actors in the film, were placed at leading multiplex chains for public viewing. The makers teamed up with Zapak.com for digital promotions, with firstly the official website titled idiotsacademy.com was launched and the lead cast came with video chatting to the fans. The website designed keeping in mind the college atmosphere and few special added features. The team later interacted with fans through video conference during the online music launch. A two-promotional tour was conducted by Khan, where he would travel across India. On the website, an alternate reality game called "Track Aamir" was launched, to track the whereabouts of the actor during this tour. The site had over 600,000 unique visitors within two weeks. During this tour,  Aamir Khan invited 24 friends personally to attend the premiere held in Mumbai, prior to the release of the film. Prior to the release promos for the film was unveiled in an event attended by the lead actors and the crew associated in the film, and press conferences streamed in seven countries. The online promos, trailer, video songs and interviews were released in YouTube.

Reliance Life Insurance started a campaign based on the song "All Is Well" and promoted it in television channels, radio stations and hoardings featuring the lead actors of the film. The makers started marketing alliances with Pantaloons Fashion and Retail, to launch their exclusive apparel and accessories collection. The special T-shirts with Khan's scribblings as designs imprinted on it, was available in 45 Pantaloons stores, which were priced . The collection also included replicas of T-shirts, garments and jewellery used by the leads in the film. As a part of promotions in Facebook, the handle called  "Pucca Idiot" was launched prior to the release, which generated 10,000 followers within 24 hours. In PVR Cinemas, the film's marketing team painted on washrooms, with the slogan "You are an idiot". Another promotional event titled "Sabse Big Idiot" was held, with the leads being present at 92.7 Big FM, asking viewers to show their idiocy. As a part of outdoor promotions, carried by Primesite Marketing Agency, innovations in hoardings, bus shelters, bus backs, platform signages and mobile vans attracted audiences. Stickers with the film's logo was pasted in 10,000 auto rickshaws that moved in cities.

Trade analysts believed that the unique promotional activity helped in the massive success of the box-office breaking several records, and also creating a nationwide impact. At the Business Standard Brand Derby summit, held at the Leela Kempinski hotel in Gurgaon on 16 July 2010, the film topped the 2009 Brand Derby, due to the unique promotions of the film.

Piracy 
In addition to encourage people watching the film in theatres, Reliance MediaWorks' marketing team managed to destroy more than 2.1 million illegal downloads. The team had its core-group working in India, United States and United Kingdom, tracked and destroyed pirated versions of the film in physical and online formats, and also issued trade notices, warning letters specific to prospective infringing sites and outlets across the overseas sectors. On 26 December 2009, a day after the film's release, the social service branch conducted a raid near Bandra station and over 2500 pirated CDs and DVDs, with 69 DVDs of this film, along with other films Avatar and Paa, were seized. In New Delhi, the sales of pirated DVDs of the film were stopped after a subsidiary company of Reliance Anil Dhirubhai Ambani Group (R-ADAG), levied a complaint to the officials to take actions against movie piracy. After the raid conducted by the police in several locations across Mumbai, former IPS officer Aftab Ahmed Khan, said that "We execute everything keeping the system in mind. We have the support of the local police so there is no question of going against the system. Piracy always existed in some form or the other. But we are getting the facts and figures only now as there are industry body who are working together to bring this menace in the forefront. To curb piracy in the long run we will have to constantly work towards means and ways to fight it."

Television and home media 
The film made its television debut on 25 July 2010, with promotions for the television premiere cost  and had attracted 12 popular sponsors to market the film. It drew an audience of 39million viewers in India, and had attracted a TVR of 13.1 at the metro cities Delhi, Mumbai and Kolkata and an overall TVR of 10.1 domestically. The cumulative reach of the film was uplifted to 30.5%. It also helped the broadcaster, Sony MAX to the third position among the general entertainment channels during that month.

On 27 August 2010, Reliance Big Entertainment launched the standard DVD and VCD editions of the film through Reliance Big Home Video. It was coincided at an event held during Grand Hyatt at Mumbai, with the presence of the cast and crew members and was broadcast live on Facebook and Twitter. It eventually sold 75,000–80,000 copies upon its launch, thereby generating a revenue of 30 –40million (US$400,000 –530,000). A month later, the special Blu-ray disc edition was launched on 5 November 2010.

In order to curb piracy, producer Chopra and Hirani stated that the film will be released and downloaded legally through YouTube on 25 March 2010, twelve weeks after its theatrical release. It was attempted for the people who cannot afford to go to multiplexes or single screens, thereby 3 Idiots becoming the first Indian film to have a legal release on YouTube. However, the film did not release as planned on that day due to copyright issues. Officially, it was released on YouTube in May 2012, but its access has since been restricted. However, it has been made available for online streaming on multiple platforms such as Netflix, Amazon Prime Video and Sony LIV.

Reception 
3 Idiots received widespread critical acclaim upon release from both domestic and international critics, with praise directed towards its direction, themes, humor, story, screenplay, soundtrack and performances of the cast.

India 
Subhash K. Jha stated: "It's not that 3 Idiots is a flawless work of art. But it is a vital, inspiring, and life-revising work of contemporary art with some heart imbued into every part. In a country where students are driven to suicide by their impossible curriculum, 3 Idiots provides hope. Maybe cinema can't save lives. But cinema, sure as hell, can make you feel life is worth living. 3 Idiots does just that, and much more. The director takes the definition of entertainment into directions of social comment". Nikhat Kazmi of The Times of India gave it four and a half stars and suggests that, "The film is a laugh riot, despite being high on fundas […] Hirani carries forward his simplistic 'humanism alone works' philosophy of the Munnabhai series in 3 Idiots too, making it a warm and vivacious signature tune to 2009. The second half of the film does falter in parts, especially the childbirth sequence, but it doesn't take long for the film to jump back on track."

Mayank Shekhar of the Hindustan Times gave the film three and a half out of five stars and comments that "this is the sort of movie you'll take home with a smile and a song on your lips." Taran Adarsh of Bollywood Hungama gave 3 Idiots four and a half out of five stars and states: "On the whole, 3 Idiots easily ranks amongst Aamir, Rajkumar Hirani and Vidhu Vinod Chopra's finest films. Do yourself and your family a favour: Watch 3 Idiots. It's emotional, it's entertaining, it's enlightening. The film has tremendous youth appeal and feel-good factor to work in a big way." Kaveree Bamzai of India Today gave 3 Idiots five stars and argues that "it's a lovely story, of a man from nowhere who wanted to learn, told like a fairy tale, with the secret heart carrying its coded message of setting all of us free."

Sonia Chopra of Sify gave the film 3 stars and said "Though a bit too calculated and designed, 3 Idiots is still an ok option for the significant message, interesting cast and scattered breezy moments." Rajeev Masand of CNN-IBN gave the film three out of five stars and states: "Going home after watching 3 Idiots I felt like I'd just been to my favorite restaurant only to be a tad underwhelmed by their signature dish. It was a satisfying meal, don't get me wrong, but not the best meal I'd been expecting." Shubhra Gupta from The Indian Express also gave it 3 stars, stating "3 Idiots does not do as much for me. The emotional truth that shone through both the 'Munnabhai' movies doesn't come through strongly enough." Raja Sen of Rediff gave the film two out of five stars and states: "Rajkumar Hirani's one of the directors of the decade, a man with immense talent and a knack for storytelling. On his debut, he hit a hundred. With his second, he hit a triple century. This time, he fishes outside the off stump, tries to play shots borrowed from other batters, and hits and misses to provide a patchy, 32*-type innings. It's okay, boss, chalta hai. Even Sachin has an off day, and we still have great hope."

Overseas 
 Derek Elley of Variety wrote that "3 Idiots takes a while to lay out its game plan but pays off emotionally in its second half." Robert Abele of Los Angeles Times wrote that there's an "unavoidable joie de vivre (symbolised by Rancho's meditative mantra 'All is well') and a performance charm that makes this one of the more naturally gregarious Bollywood imports." Louis Proyect described it as a "fabulous achievement across the board. A typical Bollywood confection but also a social commentary on a dysfunctional engineering school system that pressures huge numbers of students into suicide."

The film was praised by critics in East Asia and Southeast Asia. South China Morning Post wrote that the film "wraps a heavy message in light comedy. It is satire at its best, a powerful indictment of India's education system in which students cram for exams while stifling their dreams." Chaerim Oh of KAIST Herald wrote that "the film never harshly denounces the educational system but instead uncovers disturbing truths and unseen consequences of tremendous pressure upon students" and that "if you don't end up crying like I did (or won't admit that you did), you'll still enjoy the movie." In Japan, Yuri Wakabayashi of Eiga also gave the film a positive review.

Box office

Pre-release 
Excluding the print and advertisement costs, the film made a business , even before the theatrical release.

Following the financial turmoil, which affected the footfalls and earnings in multiplexes and single-screens, the stakeholders were not ready to buy the film for a huge amount, and reduce the price for distribution. After much deliberations, the theatrical rights were being sold at a tune of 40 –45 crore (US$5.3 –6.0 million).

3 Idiots, eventually topped online polls of the "most-awaited film of the year", with the extensive marketing campaign and pre-release contributed to it. The advance bookings of the film eventually topped to 40–45%, with major multiplexes showing advance bookings rates uplifted to more than 90% in the opening day. Amitabh Vardhan, CEO of PVR Cinemas and Alok Tandon of INOX Leisure Limited, stated that "looking at the pre-release hype, the film will have the best openings of a movie this year in terms of theatrical revenues", while trade analyst Taran Adarsh stated that "it could be easily one of the biggest blockbusters of the year".

Box office 
The film's worldwide lifetime gross was 459crore (US$90million), making it the highest-grossing Indian film at the time. The film was listed in Guinness World Records for the record of highest box office film gross for a Bollywood film. The success of the film was attributed to the content and the extensive pre-release promotions, which led to an increase in the huge number of footfalls.

The film created the highest collection record for paid previews with 2.75 crore that time, which was broken by Chennai Express (2013). In its four-day first weekend, the film netted , and broke the record held by Ghajini (Aamir's previous film) for the first weekend collections.

3 Idiots became the then highest-grossing Indian film in overseas markets, with an overseas gross of US$30.5 million (186 crore) until it was beaten by Dhoom 3 (2013). Its first weekend opening collection overseas was $4 million. It set record collections for Indian-produced films in territories such as the United States and Australia. In the United States, the film earned $6.5 million since its opening, in addition to over $2.5 million in the United Kingdom, over $2 million in Canada, and nearly $1 million in Australia. 3 Idiots has the biggest first week total in the US with around $3 million over its first four days.

3 Idiots became a success in East Asian markets, which was unusual for an Indian film at that time. The film had a fragmented but wide release in East Asian markets including China, South Korea and Hong Kong. The film had the longest showing period at cinemas in Taiwan, for more than two months from December 2010, breaking the record of Avatar (2009) with over NT$10 million (US$629,024) grossed. 3 Idiots was the first aired Indian film in Hong Kong, where it grossed HK$22 million at the box office during its showing from 1 September 2011 through January 2012, the equivalent of US$3.02 million. It was the 14th highest-grossing film of 2011 at the Hong Kong box office. In South Korea, the film grossed  (US$3,084,647). The film was number-one at the South Korean box office for five weeks, drawing an audience of 459,686 viewers.

In China, where it is known as 《》 ("3 idiots make a scene in Bollywood"), the film grossed  in 2 weeks in December 2011, eventually crossing the $3 million mark within a month, as of 5 January 2012. Upon its release in the Japanese market in June 2013, it went on to collect around ¥100 million (6.1 crore) in its first two weeks of run – that makes the film the highest-grossing Hindi film ever in Japan. The film's final gross in East Asian markets was US$.

Accolades 

3 Idiots won 58 accolades from Indian film awards; among these are six Filmfare Awards including Best Film and Best Director, three National Film Awards including Best Popular Film, ten Star Screen Awards, seventeen IIFA Awards, five GIMA Awards, two Apsara Awards and seven Bollywood Hungama Surfers Choice Movie Awards. In addition, the film received a nomination and award for Worst Song to the track "All Izz Well" at the Ghanta Awards, despite the track being a nationwide sensation among the younger generation.

In China, it was nominated for the Best Foreign Film prize at the first Beijing International Film Festival in 2011. In Japan, it was nominated in the Best Outstanding Foreign Language Film category at the 37th Japan Academy Awards in 2014; the award was eventually won by Les Misérables. In addition, 3 Idiots won the Grand Prize at the 4th Videoyasan Awards, held by a Japanese organisation of home video retailers in 2014; 3 Idiots was selected as 2013's best video release, beating thousands of films, anime and television shows, including domestic Japanese and foreign Hollywood productions.

Controversies

Chetan Bhagat story credit 

A controversy developed a few days after the release, however, over the fact that Chetan's credit, "Based on the novel Five Point Someone by Chetan Bhagat" appeared in the closing credits rather than in the opening ones. At that time, Bhagat stated that he "was expecting an opening credit and I was quite surprised on not seeing it. They had bought the rights, made the payment, and committed to a credit in the contract. It's there, but it's not about it being there, it's about the placement and the prominence." In a 31 December 2009 blog post on his personal website, Bhagat stated that he was told the movie was only 2–5% based on the book, but when he saw it, he felt that it was 70% of the book. He also argued that he was misled by the makers of the film, though he noted, that "this has nothing to do with Mr. Aamir Khan […] I am a big fan of Aamir and he has made my story reach people. However, he was told by the makers not to read the book, and he hasn't. Thus, he cannot comment on the issue in a meaningful manner."

A few people responded to Chetan's statements. According to the Indo-Asian News Service (IANS) producer Vidhu Vinod Chopra clarified that "in the agreement between the producer and Bhagat, it was clearly mentioned that the author's name would be put in the closing credits". IANS also reported that Chopra "lost his cool" and "asked a reporter to shut up after being questioned whether his hit 3 Idiots was lifted from author Chetan Bhagat's book Five Point Someone." Chopra later apologised, stating: "I really think I'm silly. I was provoked, but I shouldn't have done this. I saw myself on TV and saw how I was shouting 'shut up, shut up' like an animal. I told myself — 'what nonsensical behaviour'." Aamir Khan also responded to these claims. Rajkumar Hirani stated that "We have officially bought the rights for the film. We drew a contract with him and it clearly mentions the position of his credit. With open eyes, he had seen the contract, consulted his lawyer, and signed the agreement […] In the contract, we have said that the title would be given in the rolling credits. We haven't changed the font size. We haven't increased the speed of the title. It's exactly there where it was agreed to be." Chetan Bhagat later apologised stating, "I definitely do not have anything against team 3 Idiots. I may have some issues with the mistake they may have made but nothing about their personality or the kind of people they are. I apologize to their families if there was any distress caused to them. I also want to thank all my fans, who stood by me but I don't want them to turn against anyone especially Aamir."

Concerns about content 

On 28 December 2010, the non-governmental organisation, Coalition to Uproot Ragging from Education (CURE) co-founder Harsh Agarwal wrote a letter to the Raghavan Committee, a panel headed by former HRD Ministry R. K. Raghavan, explaining distress over a particular scene, where the lead actors gets ragged by seniors. The organisation asked the committee to write a letter to the censor board to revisit and re-examine the particular scene. The Bharatiya Janata Party, Maharashtra state spokesperson Madhav Bhandari demanded that the film should be sent for re-certification again in concern with that scene, after an incident in Seth G.S. Medical College inspired from the scene, with the Chief minister of Maharashtra, Ashok Chavan too demanded the same. Aamir Khan however stated that the film is against "ragging".

In an article published in Economic and Political Weekly, Latika Gupta mentions that the film has serious problems when seen from the gender perspective, in particular, that it follows the trend set by the 2007 film Jab We Met in its use of women's sexual vulnerability to create sensation and humour. In one scene, students, professors, and the chief guest are seen bursting with laughter hearing a speech where the word balatkar (rape) figures 21 times and the word stan (breast) four times (in the English subtitles for international release, the words "screwed" and "bosom" are used instead).

Remakes 
Shortly after the film's success, Gemini Film Circuit had purchased the remake rights of the film to be adapted in Tamil and Telugu-languages. Shankar directing the Tamil version of the film, his first remake he worked on his career. After several considerations for the leads in the remake, the team approached Vijay, Srikanth and Jiiva to reprise the roles played by Khan, Madhavan and Joshi, whilst Ileana D'Cruz essayed to reprise Kapoor's role from the film. The film, which was titled as Nanban, released on 12 January 2012 to positive reviews. For the Telugu remake, the team considered Ram Charan for the titular role same disclosed by the actor in his speech of movie promotions in Hyderabad, but the project did not materialise. Nanban was later dubbed in Telugu as Snehitudu and released two weeks after the original version. The film was remade in Mexican Spanish-language named 3 idiotas and was released in May 2017. A Hollywood-remake of this film was announced but did not come into fruition.

Legacy

Social impact 
The film had a social impact on attitudes to education in Asia, including education in India. The overwhelming success and impact in Indian society led to many authors and analysts to take a case study on the film and the message portrayed. It was also noted for the "realistic portrayal and depiction of universities, colleges and students". According to Jason Mecchi of Midstory, the film "may have even played a role in the recent reorganization of the Indian education system, designed to reduce tedium and allow children to grow in multiple fields of study, rather than those that conform to a narrow idea of success."

The film has had a similar social impact on education in other Asian countries, including education in China. Chinese universities were "even prescribing the film in their coursework as a kind of stress-relief in their classrooms. The movie has served as a question bank for many local, family, zonal and national quizzes." At the ninth edition of Chennai International Film Festival held in December 2011, Naichi Ho, the director of Taipei Economic and Cultural Centre in New Delhi expressed about the phenomenal success of 3 Idiots, saying "Five years ago no one in Taiwan watched Indian movies. The education system in our country is the same as in India. Every parent wants their children to go to the best school and there is a lot of pressure on the kids. So it's a hit among youngsters there".

The unmanned aerial vehicle (drone) featured in the film was developed by Ankit Mehta, Rahul Singh and Ashish Bhat. This led to them receiving a  contract to manufacture drones for the Indian Army. The Nitesh Tiwari directorial Chhichhore (2019) has a resemblance to this film.

Overseas markets 
When 3 Idiots released in China, the country was only the 15th largest film market, partly due to China's widespread pirate DVD distribution at the time. However, it was the pirate market that introduced 3 Idiots to most Chinese audiences, becoming a cult film in the country among youths. Aamir Khan gained a large growing Chinese fanbase as a result. By 2013, China grew to become the world's second-largest film market (after the United States), paving the way for Aamir Khan's Chinese box office success, with Dhoom 3 (2013), PK (2014), Dangal (2016) and Secret Superstar (2017). In 2011, a documentary film titled Big in Bollywood was released, which revolves about Omi Vaidya's journey from a struggling Hollywood actor to a successful Bollywood breakthrough with this film.

As of 2017, 3 Idiots has been ranked China's 12th favourite film of all time according to ratings on popular Chinese film review site Douban, with only one domestic Chinese film (Farewell My Concubine) ranked higher. The film holds an average rating of 9.2 on Douban, with over 1.15 million votes. As of 2021, the film is ranked at No. 14 on the list with mostly youth voting. On the Korean site Naver, audiences gave the film an average rating of 9.4/10, and it is one of the top 30 highest-rated films on the site.

One reason for its success in East Asian markets such as China and Hong Kong is because of their similar education systems, thus many students were able to identify with the characters. Chaerim Oh of KAIST Herald wrote that the "popularity of the movie, particularly in South Korea, can be traced back to the national background of the overly competitive education system. In Korea, students of all ages – from young elementary children to university graduate students – are trained to study under overwhelming pressure and extremely high academic standards. In short, this movie is, really, our own story."

In 2013, Hollywood filmmaker Steven Spielberg praised 3 Idiots, which he had seen three times and said he "loved the emotional undertones." He listed it as one of five films that he connects with, along with The Godfather (1972) and his own work on E.T. the Extra-Terrestrial (1982), Saving Private Ryan (1998) and Jaws (1975). The Japanese anime series Gamers! (2017) references a scene from 3 Idiots, in the final episode of the series. A poster of 3 Idiots appears in the Korean drama series Welcome to Waikiki (2018).

Possible sequel 
When asked about plans of a 3 Idiots sequel in an interview with Hindustan Times, screenwriter Abhijat Joshi replied, saying, "Honestly, I don't know. We have an idea for the 3 Idiots sequel, a Munna Bhai part three, and also for a PK sequel; but the PK and Munna Bhai sequels interest me the most. So, I think the 3 Idiots sequel may happen in the future, but these two I really want to work on." In January 2016, director Rajkumar Hirani and actor Aamir Khan confirmed that they were considering a 3 Idiots sequel. Khan told reporters, ""Raju Hirani has given me a hint about 3 Idiots sequel and I am giving you all a hint. The film will happen if and whenever he will write the script." Hirani agreed, saying "this is one film that I really want to do."

In June 2018, Hirani was asked a question while promoting his upcoming film Sanju and he was quoted as saying, "I definitely want to make a sequel to 3 Idiots, but it’s still in the initial stage and we will take a fair amount of time to develop the script". The report also said that Hirani will begin shooting for the Munna Bhai sequel with Sanjay Dutt. Work on 3 Idiots will begin only after Hirani is done with Munna Bhai 3.

See also 

 List of highest-grossing Bollywood films
 List of Bollywood highest-grossing films in overseas markets

Notes

References

External links 

 Official trailer – Vinod Chopra Films
 
 
 
 
 
 
 

2009 films
2000s Hindi-language films
2000s buddy comedy films
2000s coming-of-age comedy-drama films
Indian buddy comedy-drama films
Indian coming-of-age comedy-drama films
Indian nonlinear narrative films
Films directed by Rajkumar Hirani
Films scored by Shantanu Moitra
Films about the education system in India
Films about teacher–student relationships
Films about poverty in India
Films about suicide
Indian pregnancy films
Films based on Indian novels
Films set in universities and colleges
Films set in Delhi
Films set in Himachal Pradesh
Films set in Ladakh
Films shot in Bangalore
Films shot in Ladakh
Hindi films remade in other languages
Best Popular Film Providing Wholesome Entertainment National Film Award winners
Films that won the Best Audiography National Film Award